Aleksei Viktorovich Sapogov (born 2 April 1988) is a former Russian professional football player.

External links
 

1988 births
People from Leninsk-Kuznetsky
Living people
Russian footballers
FC Gornyak Uchaly players
FC Volga Nizhny Novgorod players
Russian Premier League players
Russia national football B team footballers
FK Spartaks Jūrmala players
Russian expatriate footballers
Expatriate footballers in Latvia
Russian expatriate sportspeople in Latvia
Association football forwards
FC Torpedo Moscow players
Sportspeople from Kemerovo Oblast